Idiyum Minnalum is a 1982 Indian Malayalam film, directed by P. G. Vishwambharan. The film stars Prem Nazir, Srividya, Ratheesh and Kuthiravattam Pappu in the lead roles. The film has musical score by Shyam.

Cast
Prem Nazir
Srividya
Ratheesh
Kuthiravattam Pappu
Mammootty
  Shanthikrishna

Soundtrack
The music was composed by Shyam and the lyrics were written by Bichu Thirumala.

References

External links
 

1982 films
1980s Malayalam-language films
Films directed by P. G. Viswambharan